"Run It!" is the debut single by American recording artist Chris Brown. It was produced by Scott Storch and written by Sean Garrett alongside guest artist Juelz Santana. The song appeared on his debut studio album, Chris Brown, and was released as a single on June 30, 2005. The remix features rappers Bow Wow and Jermaine Dupri and was performed at the 2006 Nickelodeon Kids Choice Awards by Bow Wow and Chris Brown.

Commercially, the song topped the charts in the United States, the United Kingdom, Australia and New Zealand. The song also managed to peak inside the top ten in six other countries and the top twenty in another five. The music video earned nominations at the 2006 MTV Video Music Awards for "Best New Artist" and "Viewer's Choice". Also in 2006, the radio version of the song appeared on the compilation album Now That's What I Call Music! 21

Background and composition
"Run It" was released as Brown's debut single on June 30, 2005, through digital distribution. On July 19, 2005, Jive and Zomba Records serviced the song to rhythmic crossover radio in the United States. They later solicited the song to contemporary hit radio on October 3, 2005. "Run It" was written and produced by Scott Storch and Sean Garrett. It interpolates The Waitresses' 1980 single "I Know What Boys Like", written by Christopher Butler. The track is composed in the key of C# minor as a Crunk&B song that consists of slinky synth beats, a catchy chorus, an ominous, creepy background, and elements of Scott Storch productions. Brown's vocals have been described as "sweet" and "baby mack"-like. Christian Hoard of Rolling Stone called the song "a de-crunked 'Yeah!' that gets by thanks to a slinky synth beat and the mix of smooth seduction and cunning come-ons in Brown's baby-mack vocals." The song features rap verses from American hip-hop recording artist Juelz Santana.

Music video
The music video for "Run It!" was released on August 8, 2005.  Directed by Erik White, it portrays an underground dance inside a school gym, where Brown meets a girl (Destiny Lightsy) that he is suddenly attracted to and with whom he wants to dance. The video features several dance sequences in which the males and females dance off against each other. During the sequences, Brown makes several movements toward his love interest. At the end, Brown and his love interest are about to kiss before the security guards arrive, and the whole gym is evacuated, with both of them pulled in separate directions. However, as soon as the guards find nobody there, they start dancing. The music video received two nominations at the 2006 MTV Video Music Awards for "Best New Artist" and "Viewer's Choice", but lost to Avenged Sevenfold's "Bat Country" and Fall Out Boy's "Dance, Dance", respectively.

Critical reception
Bill Lamb of About.com awarded "Run It!" a four-star rating, commending the song's backing music, Brown's voice, and chorus, but called it "another cookie cutter Scott Storch production." Andy Kellman of AllMusic noted it as one of the album's top tracks, commenting that the song's "way of tempering Brown's small-town innocence with hard-edged backing and a guest spot from an MC of ill repute is clearly a strategy to make the singer appeal to more than tween girls." Christian Hoard of Rolling Stone said that the song gets by "thanks to a slinky synth beat and the mix of smooth seduction and cunning come-ons in Brown's baby-mack vocals."

Chart performance
"Run It!" debuted at number 92 on the Billboard Hot 100 in the issue dated August 27, 2005. After eight weeks on the chart, the song entered the top ten at number eight on October 22, 2005, receiving the airplay gainer title. It gained the airplay title again in the following week, climbing to number two on the chart, where it stalled for a month. On November 26, 2005, "Run It!" peaked on the Billboard Hot 100 at number one, becoming Brown's first number one single on the chart, and making him the third youngest solo artist to top the chart, behind only Stevie Wonder and Peggy March, and the fourth youngest overall. That same week, the song was also at the top of the US Hot R&B/Hip-Hop Songs and the US Radio Songs. Two weeks later, it topped the US Pop Songs chart. The song remained on top of the Hot 100 for five weeks, becoming his longest lasting number one single on the chart. It was certified platinum by the Recording Industry Association of America (RIAA) for shipments of one million copies.

"Run It!" debuted and peaked at number one on the Australian Singles Chart in the issue dated January 29, 2006. The song remained at the top of the chart for three non-consecutive weeks and exited after fifteen weeks. It earned a gold certification from the Australian Recording Industry Association (ARIA), denoting shipments of 35,000 copies. In New Zealand, the song entered the singles chart at number 39 on the week ending January 2, 2006. Six weeks later, the song peaked at the top of the chart, where it remained for one month. "Run It!" entered the Swiss Singles Chart at number twelve on the week ending February 12, 2006. In the next week, it peaked at number five and remained in the top ten for six consecutive weeks.

Credits
 Scott Storch – songwriting, production
 Sean Garrett – songwriting, production
 Brian Stanley – mix engineer
 Val Braithwaite – assistant mix engineer
 Mike Tschupp – assistant mix engineer
 Herb Powers, Jr. – mastering engineer
 Charles McCrorey – recording engineer
 Conrad Golding – recording engineer
 Wayne Allison – recording engineer
Credits adapted from Chris Brown liner notes, Columbia Records.

Track listings

US CD single
"Run It!" (feat. Juelz Santana) - 3:49
"Run It!" (Main Version) - 3:15
"Run It!" (Instrumental) - 3:14
"Run It!" (Video) - 4:09

European CD single
"Run It!" (feat. Juelz Santana) - 3:49
"I May Never Find" - 4:35

European CD single
"Run It!" (feat. Juelz Santana) - 3:49
"Run It! (Remix)" (feat. Bow Wow & Jermaine Dupri ) - 4:04
"Run It!" (Main Version - No Rap) - 3:15
"Run It!" (Instrumental) - 3:14
"Run It!" (Video) - 4:09

Special Dutch CD Edition
"Run It!" (feat. Juelz Santana) - 3:50
"Run It!" (feat. The Partysquad) - 3:22

Vinyl
"Run It!" (feat. Juelz Santana) - 3:50
"Run It!" (Main Version) - 3:14

Vinyl remix
"Run It! (Remix)" (feat. Bow Wow & Jermaine Dupri) - 4:04
"Run It! (Remix)"" (Instrumental) - 4:04

Charts

Weekly charts

Year-end charts

All-time charts

Certifications

Radio and release history

See also
List of Billboard Hot 100 number-one singles of 2005
List of Billboard Mainstream Top 40 number-one songs of 2005
List of number-one R&B singles of 2005 (U.S.)
List of number-one singles in Australia in 2006
List of number-one singles from the 2000s

References

2005 debut singles
Billboard Hot 100 number-one singles
Chris Brown songs
Juelz Santana songs
Number-one singles in Australia
European Hot 100 Singles number-one singles
Number-one singles in New Zealand
Song recordings produced by Scott Storch
Songs written by Sean Garrett
Songs written by Scott Storch
Music videos directed by Erik White
Songs written by Juelz Santana
2005 songs
Crunk songs
Jive Records singles
Zomba Group of Companies singles